The Chief of General Staff is the professional head of the Ethiopian National Defense Force. The chief is responsible for the administration and the operational control of the Ethiopian military. The current Chief of General Staff is Field marshal general Birhanu Jula who was appointed by Prime Minister Abiy Ahmed on 4 November 2020 succeeding General Adem Mohammed.

List of chiefs

Ethiopian Empire (1941–1974)

|- style="text-align:center;"
| ?
| 
| Lieutenant GeneralEyasu Mengesha
| 
| 
| 
| Imperial Army
| 
|- style="text-align:center;"
| ?
| 
| Lieutenant GeneralHaile Baykedagen
| 
| 
| 
| Imperial Army
| 
|- style="text-align:center;"
| ?
| 
| Lieutenant GeneralAssefa Ayane
| 
| 
| 
| Imperial Air Force
| 
|- style="text-align:center;"
| ?
| 
| Lieutenant GeneralWolde Selassie Bereka
| 
| 3 July 1974
| 
| Imperial Army
| 
|-

Derg (1974–1987)

People's Democratic Republic (1987–1991)

Federal Democratic Republic (1991–present)

References

Citations

Bibliography
 
 

Military of Ethiopia
Ethiopia